Helmut Recknagel (born 20 March 1937 in Steinbach-Hallenberg) is an East German former ski jumper who was active in the late 1950s and early 1960s.

He earned a gold medal at the 1960 Winter Olympics in ski jumping and also won the Holmenkollen ski festival ski jumping competition twice (1957 and 1960). At the FIS Nordic World Ski Championships, he won three medals: a bronze in 1958 and two medals in 1962, a gold in the individual large hill and a bronze in the individual normal hill. For his ski jumping efforts, Recknagel was awarded the Holmenkollen medal in 1960 (shared with Sixten Jernberg, Sverre Stensheim, and Tormod Knutsen). He was the first German to win the Holmenkollen medal.

References
 
 Holmenkollen medalists – click Holmenkollmedaljen for downloadable pdf file 
 Holmenkollen winners since 1892 – click Vinnere for downloadable pdf file 

1937 births
Living people
German male ski jumpers
Olympic ski jumpers of the United Team of Germany
Olympic gold medalists for the United Team of Germany
Olympic medalists in ski jumping
Ski jumpers at the 1960 Winter Olympics
Ski jumpers at the 1964 Winter Olympics
Medalists at the 1960 Winter Olympics
Holmenkollen medalists
Holmenkollen Ski Festival winners
FIS Nordic World Ski Championships medalists in ski jumping
People from Steinbach-Hallenberg
Sportspeople from Thuringia